The president of the Federative Republic of Brazil is the chief executive of the government of Brazil and commander in chief of the national military forces. Below is a list of presidents of Brazil.

Brazil before the Proclamation of the Republic
Having proclaimed independence of the Kingdom of Brazil from Portugal in 1822, Pedro I, son of John VI, was acclaimed the first Emperor of Brazil on 12 October 1822. He was later succeeded on 7 April 1831 by his son Pedro II, deposed along with the 74-years-old monarchy on 15 November 1889 in a bloodless and unpopular military coup d'état.

Brazil had two monarchs during the time of the United Kingdom: D. Maria I (1815–1816) and D. João VI (1816–1822). When this Kingdom was created, Queen Maria I was already considered incapable and the Portuguese Empire was ruled by Prince João, future King João VI, as regent prince. As an independent nation, Brazil had two monarchs, Emperors D. Pedro I (1822–1831) and D. Pedro II (1831–1889). The second woman to govern Brazil, after D. Maria I, was D. Leopoldina who acted as regent in 1822 and had a great influence on Brazil's independence process, having been responsible for signing the decree that separated Brazil from Portugal.

The third woman to rule Brazil was D. Isabel, heir presumptive to the throne, who was Regent of Brazil in various periods (1870–1871, 1876–1877 and 1887–1888) while her father, Emperor Pedro II, performed foreign visits. During her last regency she sanctioned on 13 May 1888, the Golden Law (Imperial Law n.º 3.353) was the law that extinguished slavery in Brazil, considered a great milestone in the history of Brazil.

The Old Republic (1889–1930)

In 1889 the Empire of Brazil was abolished and replaced with a republic in a coup d'état led by Marshal Deodoro da Fonseca, who deposed Brazilian Emperor Dom Pedro II, proclaimed Brazil a Republic and formed a provisional government. The 15 November 1889 military coup actually began as an attempt to overthrow the Empire's prime minister, Afonso Celso, Viscount of Ouro Preto, but the unprecedented coup against a prime minister appointed by the emperor and who enjoyed the confidence of the elected Chamber of Deputies quickly escalated to the abolition of the monarchy. With the proclamation of the Brazilian Republic, the Empire's constitution ceased to operate, the Imperial Parliament (the General Assembly) ceased to exist, and not only was the Viscount of Ouro Preto removed from office, but the position of prime minister itself ceased to exist. As head of the provisional government, Marshal Deodoro da Fonseca ruled by decree, discharging both the functions of head of state and of head of government. The former provinces of the Empire were reorganized as states and the newly proclaimed republic was declared a federation, formed by the perpetual union of those states.

In 1890, elections for a Constituent Congress were summoned and held, but the decree of the provisional government that created the Congress required it to adopt a Constitution that conformed to the recently proclaimed republican system of Government, and that organized the recently declared Federal State. In February 1891, a new Brazilian constitution was adopted, based on the federal republic of the United States of America. The country itself was named the Republic of the United States of Brazil. In accordance with the provisions of the Constitution, the presidents of the Republic were to be elected by direct popular ballot, but, for the first presidential term, the president and vice president would be chosen by the Constituent Congress; the Constituent Congress was to elect the first president and vice president immediately after the promulgation of the Constitution. In accordance with those transitional provisions, Congress elected the then head of the provisional government, Deodoro da Fonseca, as the first president of the republic. Marshal Floriano Peixoto, was elected by Congress to be the first vice president. The inauguration of the first president and of the first vice president was held on 26 February 1891, only two days after the promulgation of the Constitution. Deodoro resigned the presidency ten months later after a coup d'état in which he dissolved Congress was reversed. Then, Floriano Peixoto, Deodoro's vice president, was inaugurated as president. In 1894, Peixoto was succeeded by Prudente de Morais, the first president of Brazil to be elected by direct popular ballot. De Morais, who was the first president to be elected under the permanent provisions of the Constitution adopted in 1891, was also the first civilian to assume the presidency.

Although it was theoretically a constitutional democracy, the Old Republic was characterized by the power of regional oligarchies and the seldom broken alternation of power in the federal sphere between the states of São Paulo and Minas Gerais. The vote in the countryside was often controlled by the local land owner, and less than 6% of the population had the right to vote due to literacy requirements.

In 1930, when Brazil was suffering the effects of the Wall Street Crash of 1929, a revolution broke out in the country and the old republic ended. President Washington Luís, who was supported by São Paulo oligarchies, broke the expected alternation between São Paulo and Minas and supported a candidate who was also from São Paulo, Júlio Prestes. Prestes won the rigged election, but Washington Luís was deposed three weeks before the end of his term and Prestes was never inaugurated.

Parties

The Vargas Era (1930–1946)
The Vargas Era consists of two different republics: the Second Republic from 1930 to 1937 and the Third Republic from 1937 to 1946.

Prior to 1929, Brazilian politics was controlled by an alliance between the two largest state economies; known as "coffee with milk politics", coffee growers in São Paulo combined with the dairy industry centred in Minas Gerais to create an oligarchy, with the presidency alternating between the two states. This practice was broken when the leaders of São Paulo and President Luís nominated their fellow Paulista Júlio Prestes as candidate for the presidential elections in 1930. In response, Minas Gerais, Rio Grande do Sul and Paraíba formed a 'Liberal Alliance' backing opposition candidate, Getúlio Vargas.

When Prestes won the March 1930 Presidential election, the Alliance denounced his victory as fraudulent, while Vargas's running mate, João Pessoa, was assassinated in July. The revolution began on October 3, 1930, and quickly spread throughout the country; by October 10, both Rio Grande do Sul and Minas Gerais had announced their support. Luís was deposed on October 24, and the Brazilian Military Junta of 1930 took over; Vargas assumed leadership of the junta on November 3, 1930, marking the end of the First Republic and beginning of the Vargas Era.

The 1932 Constitutionalist Revolution led to a new Brazilian Constitution in 1934. However, in 1937, following an attempted fascist revolt, the constitution was annulled and Vargas became a dictator in the name of law and order. His reign occupies two periods of Brazilian history, the Second Brazilian Republic and the Third Brazilian Republic, known as the Estado Novo.

Party

The Republic of 46 (1946–1964)

In 1945, Vargas was deposed by a military coup led by ex-supporters. Nevertheless, he would be elected president once again and his influence in Brazilian politics would remain until the end of the Fourth republic. In this period, three parties dominated the national politics. Two were pro-Vargas – in the left, PTB and in the centre-right, PSD – and another anti-Vargas, the rightist UDN.

This period was very unstable. In 1954, Vargas committed suicide during a crisis that threatened his government and he was followed by a series of short-term presidents. In 1961, UDN won national elections for the first time, supporting Jânio Quadros, who himself was a member of a minor party allied to UDN. Quadros, who, before his election, rose meteorically in politics with an anti-corruption stance, unexpectedly resigned the presidency seven months later. Some historians suggest that Quadros was heavily drunk when he signed his resignation letter, while others suggest that Quadros felt that Congress would not accept his vice-president as president, and would ask for his return. Those historians, therefore, see Quadros' resignation as an attempt to return to office with increased powers and more political support. It is possible that both occurred: Quadros was drunk when he resigned, and in that state, he devised the plan to return to power by Congressional request. The plot failed: Congress simply received Quadros' letter, and amid the shock of politicians and of the Nation, the letter was entered into the records of Congress and the presidency was declared vacant. The president of Congress, Senator Auro de Moura Andrade, took the view that the deed of resignation was the province of the elected president, that it was not subject to a congressional vote, needing no confirmation, and that the president's declaration of resignation was final.

At that time, the president and vice president of Brazil were voted into office separately. The vice president was a political enemy of Jânio Quadros, the leftist João Goulart. Goulart was out of the country, and Congress was controlled by right wing politicians. During Goulart's absence, the president of the Chamber of deputies, Ranieri Mazzilli, took office as acting president of Brazil. There was then a plot to block the inauguration of the vice president as president, but Congressional resistance to the inauguration of Goulart led to a reaction by the governor of Rio Grande do Sul, who led a "legality campaign", and to a split in the military (that, during the fourth Republic, intervened heavily in politics). Amid the political crisis, the solution was the adoption by Congress of a Constitutional Amendment abolishing the presidential executive and replacing it with a parliamentary system of government. Under that negotiated solution, Goulart's inauguration was allowed to proceed, but Goulart would be head of state only, and a prime minister approved by Congress would lead the government. The new system of government's continued existence was subject to popular approval in a referendum scheduled for 1963. The result of this referendum restored the presidential executive and a military coup deposed Goulart in 1964, starting the military dictatorship.

Parties

Military Dictatorship (1964–1985)

The military coup was fomented by José de Magalhães Pinto, Adhemar de Barros, and Carlos Lacerda (who had already participated in the conspiracy to depose Getúlio Vargas in 1945), then governors of the states of Minas Gerais, São Paulo, and Guanabara, respectively. The coup was planned and executed by the most forefront commanders of the Brazilian Army and received the support of almost all high-ranking members of the military, along with conservative elements in society, like the Catholic Church and anti-communist civil movements among the Brazilian middle and upper classes. Internationally, it was supported by the State Department of the United States through its embassy in Brasilia.

Despite initial pledges to the contrary, the military regime enacted in 1967 a new, restrictive Constitution, and stifled freedom of speech and political opposition. The regime adopted nationalism, economic development, and anti-communism as its guidelines.

The dictatorship reached the height of its popularity in the 1970s with the so-called "Brazilian Miracle", even as the regime censored all media, and tortured and exiled dissidents. João Figueiredo became President in March 1979; in the same year he passed the Amnesty Law for political crimes committed for and against the regime. While combating the "hardliners" inside the government and supporting a re-democratization policy, Figueiredo could not control the crumbling economy, chronic inflation and concurrent fall of other military dictatorships in South America. Amid massive popular demonstrations in the streets of the main cities of the country, the first free elections in 20 years were held for the national legislature in 1982. In 1985, another election was held, this time to elect (indirectly) a new president, being contested between civilian candidates for the first time since the 1960s, being won by the opposition. In 1988, a new Constitution was passed and Brazil officially returned to democracy. Since then, the military has remained under the control of civilian politicians, with no official role in domestic politics.

Parties abolished, except for two parties:

The New Republic (1985–present)

In the early 1980s the military government started a process of gradual political opening, called abertura, the final goal of which was democracy. When the term of the last military president was to end, however, no direct elections for President of Brazil took place. For the election of the country's first civilian president since the military coup of 1964, the military maintained the rule that prevailed during the dictatorial regime, according to which an Electoral College made up of the entire National Congress and representatives from State Assemblies was to elect the president. This time, however, the military placed the Electoral College under no coercion, so that its members would be free to select the president of their choice. The Chamber of Deputies and the State Assemblies had been elected, already under the abertura process in the 1982 parliamentary election, but the senators were chosen indirectly, by the State Assemblies, under rules that had been passed by the military regime in 1977 to counter the growing support of the opposition: one third of the senators was chosen in 1982, and two thirds had been chosen in 1978. After the 1982 elections, the ruling party, PDS (the successor of the ARENA), still controlled a majority of the seats in the National Congress.

Tancredo Neves, who had been prime minister during the presidency of João Goulart, was chosen to be the candidate of PMDB, the major opposition party (and the successor of the MDB Party, that had opposed the Military Regime since its inception), but Tancredo was also supported by a large political spectrum, even including a significant part of former members of ARENA, the party that supported the military presidents. In the last months of the military regime, a large section of ARENA members defected from the party, and now professed to be men of democratic inclinations. They formed the Liberal Front, and the Liberal Front Party allied itself to PMDB, forming a coalition known as the Democratic Alliance. PMDB needed the Liberal Front's support in order to secure victory in the Electoral College. In the formation of this broad coalition former members of ARENA also switched parties and joined PMDB. So, to seal this arrangement, the spot of vice-president in Tancredo Neves' ticket was given to José Sarney, who represented the former supporters of the regime that had now joined the Democratic Alliance. On the other hand, those who remained loyal to the military regime and its legacy renamed ARENA as the PDS. In the PDS's National Convention, two  right-wing supporters of the military administrations fought for the party's nomination: Colonel Mário Andreazza, then Minister of the Interior in General Figueiredo's administration, was the preferred candidate of the incumbent president and of the military elite, but he was defeated by Paulo Maluf, a civilian and former governor of São Paulo State during the military regime. Tancredo's coalition defeated Maluf, and his election was hailed as the dawn of a New Republic. Andreazza's defeat (by 493 votes to 350) and the selection of Maluf as the PDS's presidential candidate greatly contributed to the split in the party that led to the formation of the Liberal Front. The Liberal Front refused to support Maluf and joined forces with the PMDB in supporting Tancredo Neves, thus forging the Democratic Alliance. Without that split in the PDS, the election of the opposition candidate would not have been possible.

Although elected President of Brazil, Tancredo Neves became gravely ill on the eve of his inauguration and died without ever taking office. Therefore, the first civilian president since 1964 was Tancredo's running mate, José Sarney, himself an ex-member of ARENA. José Sarney's administration fulfilled Tancredo's campaign promise of passing a constitutional amendment to the Constitution inherited from the military regime, so as to summon elections for a National Constituent Assembly with full powers to draft and adopt a new Constitution for the country, to replace the authoritarian legislation that still remained in place. In October 1988, a new democratic Constitution was passed and democracy was consolidated. In 1989, the first elections for president under the new Constitution were held and the young Fernando Collor de Mello was elected for a five-year term, the first president to be elected by direct popular ballot since the military coup. He was inaugurated in 1990 and in 1992 he became the first president in Brazil to be impeached due to corruption. He however resigned before the final verdict.

A referendum held in 1993 (ahead of the 1993 and 1994 Constitutional Revision) allowed the people to decide the form of government of the state (monarchy or republic) for the first time since the proclamation of the Republic in 1889; the republican form of government prevailed. In the same referendum, the Brazilian people was able to choose again, for the first time since 1963, the system of Government (parliamentary or presidential) and the model of a presidential executive was retained. The revision was a unique opportunity to amend the Constitution with a reduced majority. Had a different form or system of government been chosen in the 1993 referendum, the new institutional structure would have been implemented during the Constitutional Revision. Both the Revision and the referendum on the form and system of government were summoned in the original text of the Constitution. The federal model of the state, retained in the 1988 Constitution, is declared by the Constitution as not subject to abolition, even by Constitutional Amendment. According to those tenets and to the results of the popular vote, only minor changes were made to the institutional framework of the State in the Constitutional Revision, including the adoption of a Constitutional Amendment that reduced the presidential term of office from five to four years.

In 1995, Fernando Henrique Cardoso was inaugurated for a four-year term. In 1997 a Constitutional Amendment was enacted allowing presidents of Brazil to be reelected to one consecutive term. In 1998, then President Fernando Henrique Cardoso became first president of Brazil to be reelected for an immediately consecutive term. In 2003 Luiz Inácio Lula da Silva was inaugurated. He was reelected in 2006. In 2011 Dilma Rousseff became Brazil's first woman president. In 2015 she began her second term, but in 2016 the Senate of Brazil convicted her on impeachment charges, and she was removed from office, being succeeded by Michel Temer. In 2018 Jair Bolsonaro was elected, taking office on 1 January 2019. In the 2022 elections, former President Luiz Inácio Lula da Silva, who had served as Brazil's President from 2003 to 2010 was again elected President, becoming the first person to win three Brazilian presidential elections. Also in the 2022 elections, Jair Bolsonaro became Brazil's first first-term President to seek reelection for a second term and lose, since the possibility of reelection to an immediately consecutive second term was first created in Brazil in 1997.

Parties

 (actual, founded in 2006)

 (defunct, founded in 1985)

Timeline

See also
List of presidents of Brazil by time in office
President of Brazil
List of Brazilian monarchs
Prime Minister of Brazil
First ladies and gentlemen of Brazil
List of governors-general of Brazil (in Colonial Brazil)
History of Brazil
List of Brazilians
List of heads of state of Brazil

Notes

References

Brazil

Presidents
Presidents